Charles Purvis, a 19th-century songwriter, was born near Otterburn, Northumberland and moved to Newcastle upon Tyne<br/ >
His employment included schoolmaster, followed by a clerk to a merchant on the Quayside. He later set up as a general merchant which failed after a short period of time "leaving a few empty barrels to pay his creditors with." In his writings he used the pen name "C.  P."

The above is virtually all that is known about Charles Purvis. It was discovered in a small note in the documentation collected by John Bell and included in Allan’s Illustrated Edition of Tyneside songs and readings  of 1891.<br/ >
C.P. is known for his song "Bards of the Tyne"

See also 
Geordie dialect words

References

External links
 Wor Geordie songwriters
Allan’s Illustrated Edition of Tyneside songs and readings

English songwriters
People from Otterburn, Northumberland
19th-century English people
Geordie songwriters